Chipingomyia is a genus of tephritid  or fruit flies in the family Tephritidae.

Species
Chipingomyia manica Hancock, 1986

References

Tephritinae
Tephritidae genera
Diptera of Africa